BCS, or bcs, may refer to:

American football
 Bowl Championship Series, a system that selected matchups for major college football bowl games between 1998 and 2013
 BCS conferences, the six FBS conferences with automatic major bowl bids under that system; since superseded by the Power Five conferences
 BCS National Championship Game, the bowl game determining the national championship team under that system

Education
 Bachelor of Computer Science
 Bachelor of Commercial Science
 Bangor Christian Schools, Bangor, Maine, United States
 Bishop Cotton School (disambiguation)
 Bishop's College School, Lennoxville, Sherbrooke, Québec, Canada
 Bullis Charter School, a public charter school in Los Altos, California, United States

Organisation
 Balochistan Civil Service
 Bangladesh Civil Service
 Bangladesh Computer Society
 Bond Christen Socialisten, a Dutch political party
 Boston Computer Society, a defunct group
 British Cartographic Society, promoting the art and science of mapmaking
 British Computer Society, a chartered professional/academic association for IT practitioners

Publications
 BCS: 50 Years, a 2010 review volume published by World Scientific
 Beneath Ceaseless Skies, a fantasy magazine
 Buddhist-Christian Studies, a scholarly journal

Science
 BCS theory of conventional superconductivity, named for Bardeen, Cooper, and Schrieffer
 Biopharmaceutics Classification System, a guidance for predicting the intestinal drug absorption
 Breast-conserving surgery, a surgical procedure less radical than mastectomy

Codes
 BCS, the IATA code for Southern Seaplane Airport in the state of Louisiana, US
 BCS, the ICAO code for European Air Transport (Belgium), a defunct cargo airline
 BCS, the National Rail code for Bicester North railway station in the county of Oxfordshire, UK
 BCS, the NYSE stock ticker symbol for Barclays plc, a UK-based bank

Other
 Battery Computer System, a small computer used by the US Army for computing artillery fire mission data
 Projektron BCS (Business Coordination Software), a web-based project management software
 Baja California Sur, state of Mexico
 Bosnian/Croatian/Serbian, a macrolanguage that is spoken in Europe
 British Crime Survey, an independent study of crime in the UK
 Bryan-College Station metropolitan area (usually styled as B/CS), a metropolitan area in Texas
 Better Call Saul, TV series

See also